The 2021 Indonesia Open (officially known as the SimInvest Indonesia Open 2021 for sponsorship reasons) was a badminton tournament that took place at the Bali International Convention Center in Nusa Dua, Badung Regency, Bali, Indonesia, from 23 to 28 November 2021. It had a total prize of US$850,000.

Tournament
The 2021 Indonesia Open was the ninth tournament according to the 2021 BWF World Tour after many tournaments got canceled due to the COVID-19 pandemic earlier of the year. It was a part of the Indonesia Open, which has been held since 1982 and was organized by the Badminton Association of Indonesia with sanction from BWF. It was also part of the Indonesia Badminton Festival in which three tournaments; the Indonesia Masters and World Tour Finals, together with this tournament were held at the same venue, played back-to-back.

Venue
This international tournament was held at Bali International Convention Center in Nusa Dua, Badung Regency, Bali, Indonesia.

Point distribution 
Below is the point distribution table for each phase of the tournament based on the BWF points system for the BWF World Tour Super 1000 event.

Prize money 
The total prize money for this tournament was US$850,000. The distribution of the prize money was in accordance with BWF regulations.

Men's singles

Seeds 

 Kento Momota (second round)
 Viktor Axelsen (champion)
 Anders Antonsen (quarter-finals)
 Chou Tien-chen (second round)
 Anthony Sinisuka Ginting (first round)
 Jonatan Christie (semi-finals)
 Lee Zii Jia (first round)
 Ng Ka Long (first round)

Finals

Top half

Section 1

Section 2

Bottom half

Section 3

Section 4

Women's singles

Seeds 

 Akane Yamaguchi (quarter-finals)
 Ratchanok Intanon (final)
 P. V. Sindhu (semi-finals)
 An Se-young (champion)
 Pornpawee Chochuwong (semi-finals)
 Michelle Li (first round)
 Busanan Ongbamrungphan (second round)
 Sayaka Takahashi (second round)

Finals

Top half

Section 1

Section 2

Bottom half

Section 3

Section 4

Men's doubles

Seeds 

 Marcus Fernaldi Gideon / Kevin Sanjaya Sukamuljo (champions)
 Mohammad Ahsan / Hendra Setiawan (first round)
 Lee Yang / Wang Chi-lin (second round)
 Fajar Alfian / Muhammad Rian Ardianto (quarter-finals)
 Aaron Chia / Soh Wooi Yik (second round)
 Chirag Shetty / Satwiksairaj Rankireddy (semi-finals)
 Kim Astrup / Anders Skaarup Rasmussen (quarter-finals)
 Vladimir Ivanov / Ivan Sozonov (first round)

Finals

Top half

Section 1

Section 2

Bottom half

Section 3

Section 4

Women's doubles

Seeds 

 Kim So-yeong / Kong Hee-yong (quarter-finals)
 Greysia Polii / Apriyani Rahayu (final)
 Jongkolphan Kititharakul / Rawinda Prajongjai (semi-finals)
 Nami Matsuyama / Chiharu Shida (champions)
 Gabriela Stoeva / Stefani Stoeva (quarter-finals)
 Chloe Birch / Lauren Smith (second round)
 Mayu Matsumoto / Ayako Sakuramoto (quarter-finals)
 Pearly Tan / Thinaah Muralitharan (second round)

Finals

Top half

Section 1

Section 2

Bottom half

Section 3

Section 4

Mixed doubles

Seeds 

 Dechapol Puavaranukroh / Sapsiree Taerattanachai (champions)
 Praveen Jordan / Melati Daeva Oktavianti (second round)
 Yuta Watanabe / Arisa Higashino (final)
 Marcus Ellis / Lauren Smith (first round)
 Chan Peng Soon / Goh Liu Ying (quarter-finals)
 Hafiz Faizal / Gloria Emanuelle Widjaja (quarter-finals)
 Thom Gicquel / Delphine Delrue (first round)
 Tang Chun Man / Tse Ying Suet (quarter-finals)

Finals

Top half

Section 1

Section 2

Bottom half

Section 3

Section 4

References

External links
 Tournament Link

Indonesia Open (badminton)
Indonesia Open
Indonesia Open (badminton)
Indonesia Open